Aurelie Luhaka (born 19 April 1992) is a Congolese team handball player. She plays for the club HB Octeville and is member of the DR Congo national team. She competed at the 2015 World Women's Handball Championship in Denmark.

References

External links

1992 births
Living people
Democratic Republic of the Congo female handball players
21st-century Democratic Republic of the Congo people